Ephrata High School is a sub-urban/urban, public secondary school in the Ephrata Area School District located in Ephrata in Lancaster County, Pennsylvania, United States.

Washington Education Center
Washington Educational Center is on Marshall Street in Ephrata Borough. It opened in October 1999, in the vacant former Washington Elementary School, as an alternative for students who could not complete the requirements of a traditional brick-and-mortar education. In 2011, the school board changed the classification of the school to a second high school in the school district. The new status means that, upon successful completion or requirements, students receive an Ephrata High School diploma.

Extracurriculars
The district offers a wide variety of clubs, activities and sports. The school's marching band was ranked in the top 10 best schools in the nation in 2014.

Notable alumni
 Jackson Davis – actor best known for his role in Lonelygirl15
 Mike Mentzer – professional bodybuilder and 1979 Mr. Olympia heavyweight champion
 Ray Mentzer – 1979 AAU Mr. America
 Joanne Parrott – former member of Maryland House of Delegates
 Evelyn Ay Sempier – 1954 Miss America
 Stanley Von Nieda - Former NBA player

References

External links
 Ephrata High School official website
 https://easdpa.org/schools/ephrata-high-school/

Public high schools in Pennsylvania
Ephrata, Pennsylvania
Schools in Lancaster County, Pennsylvania